A number of ships have been named Ever Fortune, including:

 , a cargo ship in service in 1964
 , a container ship built in 2020

Ship names